Gardena is an unincorporated community located in Boise County, Idaho, United States.

History
Gardena's population was 25 in 1960.

References

	

Unincorporated communities in Boise County, Idaho
Unincorporated communities in Idaho